Senator Sanchez may refer to:

Bernadette Sanchez (born 1953), New Mexico State Senate
Clemente Sanchez (politician) (born 1958), New Mexico State Senate
Michael S. Sanchez (born 1950), New Mexico State Senate
Pedro C. Sanchez (1925–1987), Guam Senate